Dennis Isherwood (9 January 1924 – February 1974) was an English footballer who played as a forward in the Football League for Chester after World War II. He later played non-league football for Northwich Victoria, Wellington Town, Winsford United, Macclesfield Town, Runcorn, Congleton Town and Stafford Rangers.

Career
Isherwood was signed with Rochdale during World War II and guested for Crewe Alexandra and Wolverhampton Wanderers, before signing for Wrexham. With the war still raging he guested for Port Vale on 9 May 1945 in a Potteries derby war match which was lost 4–2. After the war he made three Third Division North appearances for Frank Brown's Chester in 1946–47, before leaving Sealand Road and dropping into non-league football in 1947 with Northwich Victoria, Wellington Town, Winsford United, Macclesfield Town, Runcorn, Congleton Town and then Stafford Rangers. He later became the manager of Sandbach Ramblers.

References

Sportspeople from Northwich
English footballers
Association football forwards
Rochdale A.F.C. players
Wrexham A.F.C. players
Crewe Alexandra F.C. players
Wolverhampton Wanderers F.C. players
Port Vale F.C. wartime guest players
Chester City F.C. players
Northwich Victoria F.C. players
Telford United F.C. players
Winsford United F.C. players
Macclesfield Town F.C. players
Runcorn F.C. Halton players
Congleton Town F.C. players
Stafford Rangers F.C. players
English Football League players
English football managers
1924 births
1974 deaths